The New Caledonia women's national under-17 football team is the second highest women's youth team of New Caledonia and is controlled by the Fédération Calédonienne de Football.

OFC
The OFC Women's Under 17 Qualifying Tournament is a tournament held once every two years to decide the only qualification spot for Oceania Football Confederation (OFC) and representatives at the FIFA U-17 World Cup.

Current technical staff

Current squad
The following players were called up for the 2017 OFC U-16 Women's Championship

Caps and goals correct after the match against Fiji on August 15, 2017.

Squad for the 2016 OFC U-17 Women's Championship

Caps and goals correct after the match against Fiji on January 23, 2016.

References

External links
New Caledonia Football Federation page
Oceania Football Federation page

Women's national under-17 association football teams
women's